The 2019 FIM Motocross World Championship was the 63rd FIM Motocross World Championship season. It included 18 events, started at Neuquén in Argentina on 3 March, and ended in Shanghai, China on 15 September.
In the main MXGP class, Jeffrey Herlings was the defending champion after taking his first MXGP class title and his fourth title overall in 2018. In the MX2 class, Jorge Prado was the reigning champion, after taking his first world title in 2018.

Race calendar and results
The championship was contested over eighteen rounds in Europe, Asia and South America.

MXGP

MX2

MXGP

Entry List

Riders Championship
{|
|

Manufacturers Championship

MX2

Entry List

Riders Championship
{|
|

Manufacturers Championship

References 

Motocross World Championship seasons
Motocross World Championship